Françoise Gay (born 27 January 1945) is a Swiss alpine skier. She competed in two events at the 1964 Winter Olympics.

References

External links
 

1945 births
Living people
Swiss female alpine skiers
Olympic alpine skiers of Switzerland
Alpine skiers at the 1964 Winter Olympics
Sportspeople from Valais
20th-century Swiss women